MC Alger is an Algerian football club.

MC Alger may also refer to:

 MC Alger (handball)
 MC Alger (basketball)
 MC Alger (volleyball)
 MC Alger (women's volleyball)
 MC Alger (cycling)